John Charles McKenzie (February 18, 1860 – September 17, 1941) was a U.S. Representative from Illinois.

Born on a farm near Elizabeth, Woodbine Township, Illinois to a Scottish immigrant father, McKenzie attended the common schools, and the normal school at Valparaiso, Indiana.
He taught school in Jo Daviess County, Illinois for six years.
He engaged in the grain, flour, and feed business.
He studied law.
He was admitted to the bar in 1890 and commenced the practice of his profession in Elizabeth, Illinois.
He served as director of the Elizabeth Exchange Bank.
He served as member of the State house of representatives 1892-1896.
He served as member of Illinois Claims Commission 1896-1900.
He served in the State senate from 1900 until his resignation on May 11, 1911, and was president pro tempore 1903-1905.

Mckenzie was elected as a Republican to the Sixty-second and to the six succeeding Congresses (March 4, 1911 – March 3, 1925).
He served as chairman of the Committee on Military Affairs (Sixty-eighth Congress).
He was not a candidate for renomination in 1924.
He was appointed in 1925 a member of the commission to report the most practical method of utilizing the nitrate plant at Muscle Shoals, Alabama.
He resumed the practice of his profession in Elizabeth, Illinois, until his death in that city on September 17, 1941.
He was interred in Elizabeth Cemetery.

References

1860 births
1941 deaths
American people of Scottish descent
Florence–Muscle Shoals metropolitan area
Illinois lawyers
Republican Party Illinois state senators
Republican Party members of the Illinois House of Representatives
People from Elizabeth, Illinois
Republican Party members of the United States House of Representatives from Illinois
Schoolteachers from Illinois